
Gmina Nielisz is a rural gmina (administrative district) in Zamość County, Lublin Voivodeship, in eastern Poland.

Villages
Gmina Nielisz contains the villages and settlements of Deszkowice-Kolonia, Gościniec, Grobla, Gruszka Duża, Gruszka Duża-Kolonia, Gruszka Mała Druga, Gruszka Mała Pierwsza, Kolonia Emska, Krzak, Las, Nawóz, Nielisz, Niwa, Poprzeczka, Ruskie Piaski, Średnie Duże, Średnie Małe, Staw Noakowski, Staw Noakowski-Kolonia, Staw Ujazdowski, Staw Ujazdowski-Kolonia, Ujazdów, Wólka Nieliska, Wólka Złojecka, Zamszany, Zarudzie and Złojec.

Neighbouring gminas
Gmina Nielisz is bordered by the gminas of Izbica, Rudnik, Stary Zamość, Sułów, Szczebrzeszyn and Zamość.

References

Polish official population figures 2006

Nielisz
Zamość County